Tin Tins was an all-night Birmingham dance club that closed in 1997. It influenced many contemporaneous and subsequent dance clubs.  It was located in the current location of the Debenhams store in the Bullring Shopping Centre.

Culture

Tin Tins opened its doors in Spring 1990 as a gay club, the brainchild of Brian Wigley and Martin Healey, also the owners of the drag cabaret bar Partners (now Glamorous). Tin Tins was successful in its early years managed by Stan Cherrington and Richard O'Donnell, who focused on a younger clientele. The Nightingale, the city’s only other gay club, was more popular with an older, predominantly male customer base.

During its formative years, Tin Tins staged music acts,  including Lonnie Gordon, Hazell Dean, Sharon Redd, the pre-famous pop group Take That, and several celebrity personalities, including "The Freak" from Prisoner Cell Block H and Lily Savage. The venue also hosted DJ Funky Dunc, a member of the Hi-NRG scene. 

The early management team departed to open M&M's, a nearby gay bar. Tin Tins re-established itself under a new leadership team of Richard O'Donnell, David "Lotty" Nash, and Phil Oldershaw, who years later enjoyed similar success with the "new" Nightingale Club.

Richard O’Donnell became Tin Tin’s lead manager. He saw the value in the club’s all-night license, one of the only in the city, and launched an after-hours club called Hype. This move gave straight, “attitude-free” clubbers access, making Tin Tins unusual, as mixed gay/straight clubs were not common in the early nineties.

Music 

Tin Tins had two main music rooms: Upstairs, where uplifting house music was played; and Downstairs, which played harder house in the new Hi-NRG style. DJ Tony De Vit played downstairs in the club’s early days before taking residency at the Trade nightclub at Turnmills in London. DJ Paul Andrews, a long-term DJ and others, like Simon Baker and Dave Simmons, shaped the club’s music policy and scene. 

At first, Tin Tins would close at 2 AM and reopen as Hype, going until 6 or sometimes 8 AM. After a short time, the club simply remained open from 10 PM to 9 AM with no break. The club was unique, as clubbers felt a complete lack of prejudice. Tin Tins patrons — Black, white, gay or straight — focused on the music, dancing to tunes generally unplayed at all but a few clubs in the country at that time.

Closure

The venue was demolished in 1997 as part of the Bullring development.

References 

Nightclubs in Birmingham, West Midlands